Achatinella apexfulva is a reportedly extinct species of colorful, tropical, arboreal pulmonate land snail in the family Achatinellidae, once present on Oahu, Hawaii. A. apexfulva is the type species of the genus Achatinella. The specific name, apexfulva, meaning "yellow-tipped", refers to the yellow tip of the snail's shell.

Taxonomy 
The family Achatinellidae, to which Achatinella apexfulva belongs, represents a diverse adaptive radiation. All species of tree-snail in Hawaii are believed to have come from a single ancestral snail. How that ancestral snail made the  trip across the ocean is unknown. A longstanding theory is that a bird carried a notably smaller ancestor across the ocean and dropped it on the islands, as bird mediated dispersal has been documented in other snail species. Alternative theories include that it floated across the ocean on a mat of debris, or that it island-hopped across the Pacific in a combination of the theories. Within the Achatinellidae, A. apexfulva belongs to the Oahu clade, which evolved on Oahu island and includes most other members of the genus Achatinella.

Distribution
This species was endemic to forests of the island of Oahu in the Hawaiian archipelago, United States, but is now extinct. It was listed as federally endangered since 1981. A major cause of its population decline in the wild was predation by the rosy wolfsnail. The rosy wolfsnail, a central-American native, was introduced to Hawaii in the 1950s to control agricultural pests. However, as a carnivore of other snails it does not discriminate in its choice of food and has been the cause of at least eight other snail extinctions in Hawaii.

Other causes of the snail's decline included loss of habitat due to deforestation, introduction of rats, and the introduction of Jackson's chameleon. The problems that A. apexfulva faced are not unique: estimated extinction rates in the family Achatinellidae range between 75% and 90%. The International Union for Conservation of Nature's last study on A. apexfulva was conducted in 1996 and listed the species as Critically Endangered.

George

In 1997, in response to rapidly dwindling populations, all known remaining specimens of A. apexfulva were collected and bred in captivity. Most offspring died of unknown causes, but one successful offspring was born. This individual was named George, after Lonesome George, a Pinta Island tortoise who was also the last of his kind. By April 2011, George was the only remaining member of the species. In January 2019, George died at age 14  leaving the species reportedly extinct.

Ecology
While A. apexfulva lived on the leaves of trees, it was not herbivorous. Its diet consisted of algae and mold that it ate off leaves.

References

A
Molluscs of Hawaii
Endemic fauna of Hawaii
Critically endangered fauna of the United States
Gastropods described in 1789
Taxonomy articles created by Polbot
ESA endangered species
Species endangered by invasive species
Extinct animals of the United States